Laura K. Kissel (born May 29, 1969) is an American educator and documentary filmmaker based in Columbia, South Carolina. Kissel's work explores contemporary social and political landscapes, the representation of history and the use of orphan films.

Her award winning feature documentary Cotton Road (2014) is about the commodity of cotton and the human labor required to transform it as it travels from farms and factories to consumers.

Education
Kissel graduated from Manhattan High School in Manhattan, Kansas. She received her bachelor of science degree in cinema and photography from Ithaca College in 1991. She then went on to receive a master of fine arts degree in radio-TV-film from Northwestern University in 1999. Following graduation she relocated to Columbia, South Carolina having accepted an assistant professor position at the University of South Carolina.

Career
Kissel is drawn towards the use of the long take in documentary film and video, which she sees as a discovery process, enabled by the duration of the frame, to uncover the nature of things in an exercise for clarity. Her choice to use filmmaking as a way of engaging with the world and exploring questions about culture, memory, and historical representation is evident in themes throughout her work. Her films have been screened at the Black Maria Film Festival, the Atlanta Film Festival and the Library of Congress' Mary Pickford Theater.

Kissel is a Professor of Media Arts and Film and Media Studies at the University of South Carolina where she serves as the Director of the School of Visual Art and Design. She has worked to create an inventory of Helen Hill's films in effort to preserve her legacy. Kissel first met Hill at the University of South Carolina’s Orphan Film Symposium, where Hill gave a presentation on her experiences with saving her artistic film works after Hurricane Katrina.

Over the course of her career Kissel has received numerous awards and fellowships for her work, including a Fulbright Award, a MacDowell Colony Fellowship and funding from the South Carolina Humanities Council and the Fledgling Fund. Kissel was named as the South Carolina Arts Commission Media Arts Fellow in 2008. In 2018 she was given a Distinguished Research Service Award by the University of South Carolina.

Cotton Road
Her 2014 documentary Cotton Road tells a global story about the commodity of cotton following its life cycle alongside the human labor required to transform it as it travels from farms and factories to consumers. It has been honored with eight festival awards and been exhibited around the world in film and video festivals, at community events on sustainability, and in classrooms. Available in four languages, Cotton Road is now the cornerstone of an educational campaign by the NGO Pro Ethical Trade Finland where it’s used to promote equitable global trade, sustainable production and responsible consumption. It was included in South Carolina Educational Television’s inaugural season of the public television show Reel South and has been broadcast on more than 75 national public television stations, including in the major markets of New York, Los Angeles, and Chicago.

Filmography

Bibliography
The Research Value of Amateur Films: Integrating Amateur and Found Footage into a Film Production Course The Moving Image Journal, 2.2 (Fall 2003), 153–157.
Lost, Found and Remade:   An Interview with Archivist and Film Artist, Carolyn Faber
Film History: An International Journal, 15.2 (Spring 2003), 208–213.
The Terrain of the Long Take. Journal of Visual Culture, 7.3 (December 2008)14
Disability Is Us: Remembering, Recovering and Remaking the Image of Disability. In Filming Difference, University of Texas Press. Edited by Daniel Bernardi.  (January 2009)
The Memory Project and Other Ways of Knowing: Filmmaking, Affect and Embodied Knowledge. In Filming the Everyday: Independent Documentaries in Twenty-First Century China, Rowman and Littlefield. Edited by Paul G. Pickowicz and Yingjin Zhang. (December 2016)

References 

1969 births
Living people
People from Columbia, South Carolina
Ithaca College alumni
Northwestern University alumni
University of South Carolina faculty
American women film directors
American women academics
21st-century American women